Chukwani is a suburb on the Tanzanian island of Unguja, part of Zanzibar. It is located in the west of the island, south of Mbweni, Zanzibar, and not far from Abeid Amani Karume International Airport

References
Finke, J. (2006) The Rough Guide to Zanzibar (2nd edition). New York: Rough Guides.

Villages in Zanzibar